Allenton Access is a protected nature area consisting of  in western St. Louis County, Missouri. It is located southwest of the town of Eureka, east of the town of Pacific and bordered to the south by the Meramec River. It is part of the Meramec Greenway and Henry Shaw Ozark Corridor.

Allenton Access consists of a boat launch, parking lot, and restroom surrounded by forest. Fishing is permitted with the appropriate permit. There have been 46 bird species recorded at Allenton Access.

References

Protected areas of St. Louis County, Missouri
Conservation Areas of Missouri